Robert L. Brown (born July 24, 1950) is an American politician. He is a former member of the South Carolina House of Representatives from the 116th District, serving from 2001 to 2020. He is a member of the Democratic party.

References

External links

Living people
1950 births
Democratic Party members of the South Carolina House of Representatives
African-American state legislators in South Carolina
21st-century American politicians
People from Charleston County, South Carolina
21st-century African-American politicians
20th-century African-American people